NGC 219 is a compact elliptical galaxy located approximately 245 million light-years from the Sun in the constellation Cetus. It was discovered on September 16, 1863 by George Bond.

See also 
 List of NGC objects (1–1000)

References

External links 
 
 
 SEDS

0219
2522
Elliptical galaxies
Cetus (constellation)
Astronomical objects discovered in 1863
Discoveries by George Phillips Bond